The Supreme Court of Judicature of Barbados is the highest judicial body in the country of Barbados. It is made up of the High Court and the Court of Appeals.

Appeals from the Supreme Court can be further referred to the jurisdiction of the Caribbean Court of Justice (CCJ).

Functions
The High Court consists of Civil, Criminal, and Family branches.

The Court of Appeals handles appeals from the High Court and the magistrates' courts, and hears appeals in both the civil and criminal branches of law.  It may consist of a single Justice of Appeal sitting in chambers, or as a full court of three Justices of Appeal.

Composition
Justices of Appeal:
The Hon. Chief Justice and President Sir Marston Gibson
The Hon. Madam. Justice Sandra Mason
The Hon. Mr.Justice Andrew Burgess
The Hon. Madam Justice Kaye Goodridge

Judges of the High Court:
The Hon. Mr. Justice William Chandler
The Hon. Madam Justice Margaret Reifer
The Hon. Mr. Justice Randall Worrell
The Hon. Madam Justice Jacqueline Cornelius
Dr. The Hon. Madam Justice Sonia Richards
Dr. The Hon. Justice Olson Alleyne
The Hon. Madam Justice Michelle Weekes
The Hon. Madam Justice Pamela Beckles

Appointment of justices
Justices are appointed by the Service Commissions for the Judicial and Legal Services.

Building

Caribbean Court of Justice
The Caribbean Court of Justice (CCJ), (based in Port Of Spain, Trinidad and Tobago), is the court of last resort (final jurisdiction) for Barbados. It replaced the London-based Judicial Committee of the Privy Council (JCPC) in 2003, upon the passage of both the Caribbean Court of Justice Act and the Constitution (Amendment) Act by the Parliament of Barbados.  These acts were brought into force by Proclamation on April 8, 2005; allowing the CCJ to supersede the Privy Council as the court of final Appellate Jurisdiction. The CCJ is also entrusted with the power to resolve disputes dealing with the Caribbean (CARICOM) Single Market and Economy (CSME).

Judicial Oath
I, _, do swear that I will well and truly serve Barbados in the office of the Chief Justice/Justice of Appeal/Judge of the High Court and I will do right to all manner of people after the laws and usages of Barbados without fear or favour, affection or ill will. So help me God.

See also
 Chief Justice of Barbados

Further reading

References

External links
Barbados Supreme Court (BSC)
Office of the Attorney-General
Former Town Hall and Supreme Court Building, The Ministry of Community Development & Culture, Barbados

Law of Barbados
Government of Barbados
Barbados, Supreme Court of
Judiciary of Barbados
Courts and tribunals established in 1982
1982 establishments in Barbados